Topi Jaakola (born 15 November 1983) is a Finnish professional ice hockey defenceman who is currently playing for the ZSC Lions in the National League (NL). He was drafted by the Florida Panthers, 134th overall, in the 2002 NHL Entry Draft however opted to remain in Europe to pursue his professional career. Internationally he has represented Finland at several World Championships, where he won the 2011 World Championship.

Playing career
He played his first games at senior level during the 2000–01 season and became a regular player during the following season. He spent his entire Finnish career in the Liiga with Oulun Kärpät, winning four championships (2004, 2005, 2007, 2008). For the 2008–09 season he moved to Sweden to play in Södertälje SK.

On 30 July 2014, at the completion of his contract with HC Lev Praha, Jaakola remained in the KHL but returned to Finland in agreeing to a two-year contract with Jokerit.

International play
Jaakola has played for Finland at seven World Championships. He won the gold at the 2011 World Championship and a silver in 2016. He also played for the Finnish national junior team, and won bronze medals in 2002 and 2003.

Career statistics

Regular season and playoffs

International

References

External links

1983 births
Living people
Amur Khabarovsk players
Finnish expatriate ice hockey players in the Czech Republic
Finnish expatriate ice hockey players in Russia
Finnish expatriate ice hockey players in Sweden
Finnish expatriate ice hockey players in Switzerland
Finnish ice hockey defencemen
Florida Panthers draft picks
HV71 players
Jokerit players
Oulun Kärpät players
HC Lev Praha players
Luleå HF players
Södertälje SK players
Sportspeople from Oulu
HC TPS players